MNC Trijaya FM (formerly known as Trijaya FM Network, Sindo Radio and Sindo Trijaya FM) is an Indonesian radio network founded in 1970.

Network

Radio stations
 MNC Trijaya FM Jakarta (104.6 FM) PT. Radio Trijaya Shakti
 MNC Trijaya FM Banda Aceh (96.9 FM)
 MNC Trijaya FM Surabaya (104.7 FM) PT. Radio Cakra Awigra
 MNC Trijaya FM Pekanbaru (104.2 FM)
 MNC Trijaya FM Banjarmasin (104.3 FM) PT. Radio Suara Banjar Lazuardi
 MNC Trijaya FM Dumai (100.5 FM) PT. Radio Kalender Angkasa
 MNC Trijaya FM Lahat (98.4 FM)
 MNC Trijaya FM Baturaja (94.1 FM)
 MNC Trijaya FM Yogyakarta (97.0 FM) PT. Radio Efkindo
 MNC Trijaya FM Pontianak (97.5 FM)
 MNC Trijaya FM Makasar, via SIP FM (93.9 FM)
 MNC Trijaya FM Manado, via CWS-FM (89.4 FM)
 MNC Trijaya FM Medan (95.1 FM) PT. Radio Prapanca Buana Suara
 MNC Trijaya FM Kendari (92.4 FM)
 MNC Trijaya FM Bandung (91.3 FM) PT. Radio Mancaswara
 MNC Trijaya FM Semarang (89.8 FM) PT. Radio Suara Caraka Ria
 MNC Trijaya FM Palembang (87.6 FM) PT. Radio Tiara Gempita Buana
 MNC Trijaya FM Kayuagung (91.7 FM)
 MNC Trijaya FM Palu (92.3 FM)
 MNC Trijaya FM Cirebon (96.5 FM)
 Pesona FM Padang (105.0 FM)
 Gemaya FM Balikpapan (104.5 FM)
 RBFM Samarinda (87.7 FM)

Satellite network
 Palapa D 3774/H/6500 MPEG-4
 Palapa D 4186/V/8800 MPEG-2

Media subscribe customer-based network
 MNC Vision Channel 500
 First Media Channel 601

Programming

Current programs
 Trijaya Hot Topic (Local Broadcast)(Morning, every Monday-Friday, 6-10am & Evening, every Monday-Friday, 4-8pm)
 Polemik (every Saturday, 10am-12pm)
 Lintas Trijaya (every 3 minutes)
 Trijaya Sports
 Reportase Trijaya FM
 Indonesia dalam Berita
 Live Wisdom
 Bincang Finansial
 Power of Life
 Market Report
 Tokoh Bicara
 Coffee Corner
 Indonesia Bersaing
 The Leader
 Pit Stop
 Cruisin' the Night
 Trijaya Rock Hits (every Friday, 8pm)
 Late Nite Hits
 Book Talk
 Wake Up Call
 Music Mix
 Trijaya Weekend
 Weekend Update
 Healthy Life
 Komunitas Buku

Previously-aired programmes

As Trijaya FM
 RCTI News
 Nuansa Pagi
 Seputar Indonesia
 Top 40
 Good Morning Trijaya Listeners
 The Retro Show
 Business World
 Happy Hour
 Fisioterapi
 Carlo Carlos Show
 Trend & Perilaku
 TGIF
 Bisnis & Etiket
 Seksologi
 Sixties Round The Clock
 It's Saturday & Y Not
 Jamz Report
 Lintasan Informasi
 On The Radio
 Bincang Sabtu
 Trijaya News Round Up
 Dance Music
 Bedah Kasus
 K-Pop Trijaya
 Seks, Problema & Solusinya
 Intrik Bersama Kafi Kurnia
 Narkoba Masalah Kita
 Solusi Sehat
 Jammin On Jazz
 Indonesia First Channel
 After Office Hour
 Parliament On Radio
 Everlasting Hits
 Trijaya Local Vocal
 Trijaya All Time Hits
 Sweet Rock Supreme
 More Than Just Night
 Drive N Jive

Slogans

As Trijaya FM
 Real Radio (1991-2011)
 More Than Just Music (1991-2011)

As Sindo Radio
 Sumber Informasi Terpercaya (2011-2013)

As Sindo Trijaya FM
 Untuk Indonesia Lebih Baik (2013-2015)
 Informasi & Lagu Enak (2015-2016)
 The Real News & Information (2016-2017)

As MNC Trijaya FM
 The Real News & Information (2017–present)

Jingles 
The Trijaya FM jingles throughout the history. Previously Trijaya FM used the KOST 103 and Sky Radio Jingles from JAM creative productions. As MNC Trijaya FM The jingles used the WLIT FM from Reelworld

Jingle Trijaya FM as JAM
 More Than Just Music, FM On Trijaya
 You Are Listening To Trijaya FM, More Than Just Music
 You Listening The Real Radio, 104,6
 Trijaya FM Radio From Jakarta
 104,6 Trijaya FM Jakarta

Jingle MNC Trijaya FM as Reelworld
 Think Sharp, Work Smart, Have Fun, 104,6 Trijaya FM
 104,6 Trijaya FM Jakarta
 Enjoy The Wonderful Weekend 104,6 Trijaya FM (Weekend Version)
 Trijaya FM
 MNC Trijaya FM, The Real News and Information

External links
 MNC Trijaya FM Website

Indonesian radio networks
1991 establishments in Indonesia
Radio stations in Jakarta
Media Nusantara Citra